The Quintet in E major for Piano and Winds, K. 452, was composed by Wolfgang Amadeus Mozart on March 30, 1784 and premiered two days later at the Imperial and Royal National Court Theater in Vienna.  Shortly after the premiere, Mozart wrote to his father that "I myself consider it to be the best thing I have written in my life."  It is scored for piano, oboe, clarinet, horn and bassoon.

Music

There are three movements:

The first movement is in sonata form. It opens with a slow introduction, marked Largo.  After the slow section cadences on a B dominant chord with a fermata (where the pianist will often improvise an eingang), the movement's main theme appears featuring solo piano and is taken up by the winds a few bars later.  The theme appears in the development with the piano in A major, B minor, C minor, and then in C major by the oboe.  The movement ends with two E major chords.

The second movement is often marked Larghetto, but the indication is missing from the autograph. The opening theme is played by the winds at the beginning of the movement but by the piano in the recapitulation.  The development, after spending one bar on a German augmented sixth chord with a root of C, abruptly goes into the distant key of E minor for one bar, and four bars later, ends up back in the home B major.

The third movement, marked Allegretto, is a five-part rondo (in A-B-A-C-A form), with the primary theme played first by piano solo and then by the winds shortly thereafter.  After the B section, which is primarily in B major, the A returns for a second time. Towards the end of the C section, the piano and winds play a E major I chord with a fermata, prompting a cadenza.  Unlike the concerti Mozart wrote in this time period, this cadenza is played by all five instruments of the quintet.  It is not until some time of cadenza-like material has passed that the third appearance of A is heard.  After many bars of piano, the movement ends on two tutti E major chords. The finale of the piece was rewritten by a person other than Mozart, but since the autograph is accessible, the attempted forgery was discovered and corrected.

This piece was allegedly the inspiration for the Quintet in E for Piano and Winds, Op. 16 by Ludwig van Beethoven, who composed this tribute in 1796. The compositions share their key and scoring.

In 1995, French composer Jean Françaix (1912-1997) arranged the quintet to a Nonetto for nine instruments (oboe, clarinet in B, horn in E, bassoon, 2 violins, viola, cello and double bass), reworking the piano part for the strings.

References
Notes

Sources

External links

Chamber music by Wolfgang Amadeus Mozart
Mozart
1784 compositions
Compositions in E-flat major